The Deadwood Formation is a geologic formation of the Williston Basin and Western Canada Sedimentary Basin. It is present in parts of North and South Dakota and Montana in the United States, and in parts of Alberta, Saskatchewan, and southwestern corner of Manitoba in Canada. It is of Late Cambrian to Early Ordovician age and was named for exposures in Whitewood Creek near Deadwood, South Dakota. It is a significant aquifer in some areas, and its conglomerates yielded significant quantities of gold in the Black Hills of South Dakota.

It preserves trace fossils such as Skolithos, and remains of Late Cambrian trilobites and brachiopods, as well as Ordovician fossils.

A 20 MW geothermal power plant is under construction, drilling 3.5 kilometers down.

Stratigraphic position
At the type locality in the Black Hills of South Dakota and in many other areas, the Deadwood Formation rests unconformably on Precambrian metamorphic rocks that were exposed to a long period of erosion prior to the deposition of the formation. In western Montana, western Saskatchewan and Alberta it overlies the Middle Cambrian rocks of the Earlie Formation or the Pika Formation.

In the Williston Basin it is overlain by the Winnipeg Formation in the center and by the Red River Formation near the margins. In the central and southern Black Hills it is overlain by the Mississippian Englewood Formation. In Alberta and Saskatchewan it is overlain by the Devonian Elk Point Group.

Lithology
In the type area, the Deadwood Formation consists of a basal conglomerate and buff sandstones, overlain a sequence of by grey-green shales, carbonate rocks, and glauconitic quartzose sandstones. Skolithos borings are present in some units. The Deadwood conglomerates contained significant quantities of gold in the Black Hills.

In Saskatchewan the Deadwood consists of fine to very coarse, commonly glauconitic, micaceous, feldspathic, slightly argillaceous and calcareous quartzose sandstones, with minor shales and conglomerates. Conglomerates are common near the base of the formation. They typically consist of Precambrian rock fragments set in finer-grained sediments, and are normally poorly sorted and unstratified.

Environment of deposition
In most areas the sediments of the Deadwood Formation were deposited in near shore, shallow water environments as an ancient sea advanced across the exposed and weathered landscape of Precambrian rocks. Most of the conglomerates appear to be matrix-supported debris flow deposits.

Thickness and distribution
The Deadwood Formation is present beneath large areas of the northern plains, and its thickness can vary over short distances due largely to the substantial topographic relief on the eroded Precambrian surface. It thins to zero eastward and is absent in northeastern North Dakota and most of eastern Saskatchewan. It thickens westward throughout Saskatchewan and Montana to the Saskatchewan-Alberta border, where it exceeds . From there it thins towards the mountain front to the west. In the north the formation extends almost to 55°N latitude.

See also

 List of fossiliferous stratigraphic units in North Dakota
 Paleontology in North Dakota
 Black Hills Gold Rush

References

 

Cambrian System of North America
Ordovician System of North America
Western Canadian Sedimentary Basin
Geologic formations of Alberta
Geologic formations of North Dakota
Geologic formations of South Dakota
Cambrian Alberta
Cambrian North Dakota
Cambrian geology of South Dakota
Cambrian Saskatchewan
Ordovician Alberta
Ordovician geology of North Dakota
Ordovician geology of South Dakota
Ordovician Saskatchewan
Cambrian southern paleotropical deposits